Walt Disney Classics (also known as The Classics from Walt Disney Home Video) is a discontinued video line launched by Walt Disney Telecommunications and Non-Theatrical Company to release Disney animated features on home video. The last title in the Classics line was The Fox and the Hound. With the release of Snow White and the Seven Dwarfs, all of the existing titles (with the exception of Pinocchio, Fantasia, The Fox and the Hound, The Great Mouse Detective, The Rescuers Down Under, Beauty and the Beast and Aladdin) in the Classics line were ported over to the Masterpiece Collection line, after the Classics line was cancelled in the United States and Canada.

Videocassette releases in the series became highly sought-after and are very popular with collectors, since most retailers had the first home video release for Disney animated features in their stores until the line was discontinued.

Disney continued releasing its animated features in the Classics line in its foreign language equivalents until around 2007 throughout Europe, and "Walt Disney Meisterwerke" – the German equivalent series – is still in operation as of 2010 through its broader "Special Collection" range.

Background
Disney has used the word Classics to describe three types of feature-length films that include animation:

 Animated features that contain one continuous story; these are most-closely identified with the Classics line.
 Films made up of several shorter, self-contained animated stories. This includes the six package films produced from 1942 to 1949, most of which include live-action characters. Another example is The Many Adventures of Winnie the Pooh, released theatrically in 1977, which was a compilation of several shorter Winnie the Pooh films that had been released previously. The one exception is Fantasia where its segments' titles were told by the narrator without title cards hence included in the Classics line above. 
 Live action features which contain fully animated sequences or characters. So Dear to My Heart, Mary Poppins, Bedknobs and Broomsticks and Pete's Dragon are examples.

Some of the animated package films and live-action films featuring animation were released on home video in the early 1980s, such as The Three Caballeros and Fun and Fancy Free, but most of them were not big sellers.

Disney's Classics category was originally defined during discussions for the April 18, 1983 launch of Disney Channel. While the people at Disney were looking through their inventory of films to see what was available for the new cable channel, they decided that they could air some fan-favorite films such as Alice in Wonderland and Mary Poppins, but that 15 other animated movies would never be aired.

These 15 animated feature films – Snow White and the Seven Dwarfs, Pinocchio, Fantasia, Bambi, Cinderella, Peter Pan, Lady and the Tramp, Sleeping Beauty, 101 Dalmatians, The Sword in the Stone, The Jungle Book, The Aristocats, Robin Hood, The Rescuers and The Fox and the Hound – had only been shown at theaters, not television or any other format (except for The Sword in the Stone, which aired on television in 1985 for the first time). These 15 movies laid the foundation upon which the Disney company was built. During each re-release to theaters (on a roughly seven-year cycle), they earned money comparable to new releases; it was thought the company would lose this revenue if they released the feature films on video or television.  By the time the Masterpiece Collection replaced the Classics collection in the domestic market, Snow White and the Seven Dwarfs and The Aristocats were the only two of the original 15 classics that had not yet been released to video or shown on television (and the sole two pre-1985 single-narrative animated features not to be released in the Classics collection).

All of the single-story animated features made by Disney were included in the list of 15 classics except for two. The exceptions were Dumbo and Alice in Wonderland, both of which had been shown on television at the earliest opportunity. The Disneyland TV series began with The Disneyland Story, but the very next thing to be aired was Alice in Wonderland (broadcast November 3, 1954), which was edited to fit into the one-hour TV time slot. The following season began on September 14, 1955, with a one-hour version of Dumbo. Both of these movies were released on video within the first two years of the creation of Walt Disney Home Video; the videos were only briefly available for rental before they became available for sale.  Despite always being available, Dumbo and Alice in Wonderland have made millions of dollars in subsequent home video releases.

North American release history

See also
 List of Walt Disney Animation Studios films
 List of best-selling films in the United States

References

Walt Disney Studios (division) franchises
Home video lines
Disney home video releases